Val Skinner (born October 16, 1960) is an American professional golfer who played on the LPGA Tour.

Amateur career
Skinner was born in Hamilton, Montana. She was the 1974 Nebraska Junior Girls champion and the 1976 Nebraska High School State champion and won both these titles in 1978. She was also the 1980 Nebraska Match Play champion. She played her collegiate golf at Oklahoma State University where she was 1980 and 1982 Big Eight champion and the 1982 Big Eight Outstanding Female Athlete of the Year.

Professional career
She began her professional career on the Women Professional Golfers' European Tour (WPGET) as the Ladies European Tour was known at the time and had four wins. She gained exempt status for the LPGA Tour in 1983 by finishing tied for third at the LPGA Final Qualifying Tournament. She has six LPGA career victories and was a member of the 1996 U.S. Solheim Cup team and Captain of the 2003 U.S. PING Junior Solheim Cup team.

She has established the Val Skinner Foundation to promote awareness of breast cancer risks and early breast cancer detection.

Professional wins

LPGA Tour wins

LPGA Tour playoff record (1–1)

Team appearances
Professional
Solheim Cup (representing the United States): 1996 (winners)
Handa Cup (representing the United States): 2014 (winners)

References

External links

American female golfers
Oklahoma State Cowgirls golfers
LPGA Tour golfers
Ladies European Tour golfers
Solheim Cup competitors for the United States
Golfers from Montana
Golfers from New Jersey
People from Hamilton, Montana
People from Bay Head, New Jersey
Sportspeople from Ocean County, New Jersey
1960 births
Living people